Williamsport, Ohio is a village in Pickaway County.

Williamsport, Ohio may also refer to:

Williamsport, Columbiana County, Ohio, an unincorporated community
Williamsport, Morrow County, Ohio, an unincorporated community